Mikko Hokka (5 February 1932 – 18 August 1973) was a Finnish weightlifter. He competed in the men's featherweight event at the 1952 Summer Olympics.

References

External links
 

1932 births
1973 deaths
Finnish male weightlifters
Olympic weightlifters of Finland
Weightlifters at the 1952 Summer Olympics
People from Savonlinna
Sportspeople from South Savo